TCPS may refer to:

Town Centre Private Schools
Tennessee Christian Preparatory School
Tri-Council Policy Statement: Ethical Conduct for Research Involving Humans